Wilfried Soltau (17 June 1912 – 27 September 1995) was a West German sprint canoer who competed in the 1950s. Competing in two Summer Olympics, he won two bronze medals at London in 1952, earning them in the C-2 1000 m and C-2 10000 m events.

References
Wilfried Soltau's profile at Sports Reference.com

1912 births
1995 deaths
Canoeists at the 1952 Summer Olympics
Canoeists at the 1956 Summer Olympics
German male canoeists
Olympic canoeists of the United Team of Germany
Olympic canoeists of West Germany
Olympic bronze medalists for West Germany
Olympic medalists in canoeing
Medalists at the 1952 Summer Olympics